Sulm or Sülm may refer to:

 Sulm (Germany), a river in Germany
 Sulm (Austria), a river in Austria
 Sülm, a municipality in Rhineland-Palatinate, Germany
 Sulm (Greyhawk), an ancient nation in the Dungeons & Dragons World of Greyhawk campaign setting